Martin Hiller (born 8 April 2000) is a German sprint canoeist.

He won a medal at the 2019 ICF Canoe Sprint World Championships.

References

External links

2000 births
Living people
German male canoeists
ICF Canoe Sprint World Championships medalists in kayak
Sportspeople from Potsdam